The  flows through the central portion of the island of Iriomote in the Yaeyama District in Okinawa Prefecture, Japan. It is the longest river in Okinawa.

References 

Rivers of Okinawa Prefecture
Rivers of Japan